is a town located in Kasuya District, Fukuoka Prefecture, Japan, between Koga and Higashi Ward of Fukuoka City.

As of 2016, the town has an estimated population of 31,236 and a density of 1,700 persons per km2. The total area is 18.93 km2 and includes the island Ainoshima. A JR station opened in March 2010.

Famous people
 Yui, stylized as YUI or yui was born in Kasuya.

References

External links

Shingū official website 

Towns in Fukuoka Prefecture